Chotyniec  (Khotynets’) is a village in the administrative district of Gmina Radymno, within Jarosław County, in the Subcarpathian Voivodeship of south-eastern Poland, close to the border with Ukraine. It lies on the Route of Wooden Architecture.

The village has a population of 340. Before the Second World War, the population of Chotyniec was mainly Ukrainian. After Operation Vistula in 1947, only 740 inhabitants were left. After 1956, a number of Ukrainian families started to return.

Cerkiew (Wooden Church) of the Holy Mother of God

This Ukrainian Greek Catholic Church, probably founded in 1617, is one of the few still active Greek Catholic churches in Poland that survived both World War II and the deportations afterwards. The church has been renovated a number of times (e.g. in 1733 and 1858), and was closed from 1925 until 1947. It then became a Roman Catholic church until somewhere in the 1980s, when it was abandoned. After the fall of Poland's communist regime it became a Ukrainian Greek Catholic church again. It was extensively restored between 1991 and 1994, mostly paid for by local parishioners.

The building is of distinguished originality because of its harmonious, solid appearance. Inside, a complete iconostasis can be seen, as can a Baroque painting of the last judgment from 1735.

In 2013 Church was inscribed onto UNESCO World Heritage Site list.

References

Chotyniec